Finnur Jóhannsson (born 28 July 1955) is an Icelandic musician, singer and songwriter. He has been involved in the Icelandic music business for decades and performed the song "Allt eða ekki neitt" in the 2007 Söngvakeppni Sjónvarpsins.

References

1955 births
Living people
Finnur Johannsson
Finnur Johannsson